Lieutenant General Sir Allan Macnab Taylor KBE MC (26 March 1919 – 13 June 2004) was a British Army officer who commanded 1st Division.

Military career
Educated at Fyling Hall School, Taylor was commissioned into the Royal Armoured Corps in 1940 during World War II. As a Squadron Commander with 7th Royal Tank Regiment, he took part in the Normandy landings in June 1944, the seizing of a bridgehead over the River Odon later in the month and the Battle for Caen in July 1944. He also took part in the crossing of the River Rhine in March 1945.

He was made Commanding Officer of 5th Royal Tank Regiment in 1960 and Commanding Officer of 3rd Royal Tank Regiment in 1961. He was appointed assistant adjutant and quartermaster general for 1st Armoured Division in 1962, Commandant of the Royal Armoured Corps Gunnery School at Lulworth in 1963 and Commander of the Berlin Brigade in Germany in 1964. He went on to be General Officer Commanding 1st Division in 1968, Commandant of the Staff College, Camberley in 1970 and General Officer Commanding South East District in 1972. His last posting was as Deputy Commander-in-Chief UK Land Forces in 1973 before he retired in 1976.

Family
In 1945 he married Madelaine Turpin (marriage dissolved in 1963); they had two daughters.

References

|-

|-

|-

1919 births
2004 deaths
Graduates of the Royal College of Defence Studies
British Army generals
British Army personnel of World War II
Commandants of the Staff College, Camberley
Graduates of the Staff College, Camberley
Knights Commander of the Order of the British Empire
People educated at Fyling Hall School
People from Caterham
Recipients of the Military Cross
Royal Tank Regiment officers
Royal Armoured Corps officers